The Aban is a river in Krasnoyarsk Krai, Russia. It is a right tributary of the Usolka and belongs to the Yenisey basin.

References 

Rivers of Krasnoyarsk Krai